Alvick Avhikrit Maharaj is a Fijian politician and Member of the Parliament of Fiji for the FijiFirst Party. He served as the assistant Minister for Employment, Productivity, Industrial Relations, Youth and Sport.  He was re-elected to Parliament in the 2018 election. In 2022, as FijiFirst lost the election, Maharaj subsequently lost his portfolio, despite being re-elected to a 3rd term in Parliament.

References

Living people
Indian members of the Parliament of Fiji
FijiFirst politicians
Fijian businesspeople
Government ministers of Fiji
Politicians from Macuata Province
Politicians from Labasa
Year of birth missing (living people)